Tri-County Fish and Wildlife Area is a protected area that covers  and is dedicated to providing hunting and fishing opportunities for the public. It is located between Indiana State Road 13 and State Route 5, northeast of Warsaw, IN.

Facilities
Wildlife Viewing
Ice Fishing
Hunting
Trapping
Shooting Range
Archery Range
Dog Training Area
Boat Ramp (Electric tolling motors only)

References

Parks in Indiana
Protected areas of Kosciusko County, Indiana
Protected areas of Noble County, Indiana
Protected areas established in 1951
1951 establishments in Indiana